Conus thevenardensis is a species of sea snail, a marine gastropod mollusk in the family Conidae, the cone snails and their allies.

Like all species within the genus Conus, these snails are predatory and venomous. They are capable of "stinging" humans, therefore live ones should be handled carefully or not at all.

Notes
Additional information regarding this species:
 Taxonomy: The status of Conus nielsenae, Conus reductaspiralis and Conus thevenardensis has been disputed by some authors, but Australian specialists generally regard them as distinct. For conservation evaluation, all three are here listed as distinct and as alternative representations in the genus Kioconus.

Description
The size of the shell varies between 27 mm and 61 mm.

Distribution
This marine species is endemic to Australia and occurs off Thevenard Island, Western Australia.

References

 Walls, J.G. 1979. Three new Indian Ocean cones. The Pariah 5: 1-8 
 Motta, A.J. da 1987. A new Conus species endemic to Thevenard Island, W. Australia. La Conchiglia 19(222-223): 29-30
 Wilson, B. (1994) Australian marine shells. Prosobranch gastropods. Vol. 2 Neogastropods. Odyssey Publishing, Kallaroo, Western Australia, 370 pp.
 Röckel, D., Korn, W. & Kohn, A.J. 1995. Manual of the Living Conidae. Volume 1: Indo-Pacific Region. Wiesbaden : Hemmen 517 pp.

External links
 To World Register of Marine Species
 Cone Shells - Knights of the Sea
 

thevenardensis
Gastropods of Australia
Gastropods described in 1987